Missing Pieces is a 2001 compilation album by Talk Talk. The first six tracks are the A- and B-Sides of the three CD singles released in 1991 for their final album Laughing Stock. Four of these are versions of album tracks, with the addition of the otherwise uncollected B-Sides "Stump" and "5:09".  The final track, "Piano", was recorded pseudonymously by Mark Hollis (as "John Cope", the title of the B-Side of their 1988 single "I Believe in You" from the album Spirit of Eden) for the 1998 album "AV 1" by Allinson / Brown, which was produced by former Talk Talk producer Phill Brown.  According to Hollis, it was designed to cycle indefinitely for a Dave Allinson/Phill Brown art exhibition and is presented twice in a row on the CD.  Missing Pieces was released in 2001 to a generally mixed to positive reception.

Reception

Leonard's Lair gave 3/5 stars, with "5:09" listed as the album highlight. The mixed score was because "if many more tenuous releases see the light of day there's a danger of that impression being cheapened." AllMusic also gave it a 3/5 star review, despite the review being more positive.

Track listing

Personnel 
 Mark Hollis – vocal, guitar, piano, organ
 Lee Harris – drums
 Tim Friese Greene – organ, piano, harmonium
 Mark Feltham – harmonica
 Martin Ditcham – percussion
 Levine Andrade, Stephen Tees, George Robertson, Gavyn Wright, Jack Glickma, Garfield Jackson, Wilfred Gibson – viola
 Simon Edwards, Ernest Mothle – acoustic bass
 Roger Smith, Paul Kegg – cello
 Henry Lowther – trumpet, flugel horn
 Dave White – contra bass clarinet

Production
 Phill Brown – engineering (Tracks 1–6), production (Track 7)
 Tim Friese-Greene – production (Tracks 1–6)
 James Marsh – cover art

References

Talk Talk albums
2001 compilation albums